Adolf Schreyer (9 July 1828, Frankfurt-am-Main29 July 1899, Kronberg im Taunus) was a German painter, associated with the Düsseldorf school of painting.

Biography
He studied art first at the Städel Institute in his native town, and then at Stuttgart and Munich. He painted many of his favourite subjects in his travels in the East. He first accompanied Maximilian Karl, 6th Prince of Thurn and Taxis through Hungary, Wallachia, Russia and Turkey; then, in 1854, he followed the Austrian army across the Wallachian frontier. In 1856 he went to Egypt and Syria, and in 1861 to Algiers. In 1862 he settled in Paris, but returned to Germany in 1870; and settled at Cronberg near Frankfurt, where he died.

Work

Schreyer was, and is still, especially esteemed as a painter of horses, of peasant life in Wallachia and Moldavia, and of battle incidents. His work is remarkable for its excellent equine draughtsmanship, and for the artist's power of observation and forceful statement; and has found particular favour among French and American collectors. Of his battle-pictures there are two at the Schwerin Gallery, and others in the collection of Count Mensdorff-Pouilly and in the Raven Gallery, Berlin. His painting of a Charge of Artillery of Imperial Guard was formerly at the Luxembourg Museum. The Metropolitan Museum, New York owns three of Schreyer's oriental paintings: Abandoned, Arabs on the March and Arabs making a detour; and many of his best pictures are in the Rockefeller family, Vanderbilt family, John Jacob Astor, William Backhouse Astor, Sr., August Belmont, and William Walters collections. At the Kunsthalle Hamburg is his Wallachian Transport Train, and at the Staedel Institute, Frankfort, are two of his Wallachian scenes.

References

External links

 More works by Schreyer @ ArtNet

1828 births
1899 deaths
19th-century German painters
German male painters
German painters of animals
Artists from Frankfurt
19th-century German male artists
Düsseldorf school of painting